Denis Volodin (born 11 July 1982) is a Kazakhstani professional footballer. He plays as a defender. He once was called up for Kazakhstan national football team, but never made an appearance officially.

Club career stats
Last update: 11 July 2008

Honours
with Astana
 Kazakhstan League Champion: 2006

External links

Living people
1982 births
Kazakhstani footballers
Association football defenders
Kazakhstan Premier League players
Veikkausliiga players
Myllykosken Pallo −47 players
FC Jazz players
FC Shakhter Karagandy players
FC Zhenis Astana players
TP-47 players
FC Atyrau players
FC Vostok players
FC Ordabasy players
FC Astana players
Kazakhstani expatriate footballers
Expatriate footballers in Finland